Petrovka is a rural locality (a village) in Tiginskoye Rural Settlement, Vozhegodsky District, Vologda Oblast, Russia. The population was 32 as of 2002.

Geography 
Petrovka is located 22 km west of Vozhega (the district's administrative centre) by road. Savinskaya is the nearest rural locality.

References 

Rural localities in Vozhegodsky District